The fourth season of the American television drama series House of Cards was announced by Netflix via Twitter on April 2, 2015. Filming began on June 16, 2015. The season premiered on March 4, 2016.

Production
On April 2, 2015, Netflix announced via its Twitter account that it had renewed House of Cards for a fourth season of undisclosed length, to be released in early 2016. The tweet read: "I will leave a legacy. #Underwood2016". The first casting calls were announced on May 5, 2015, to occur on May 15. Film crews were spotted filming on June 16, 2015.

In December 2015, it was revealed during a 2016 Republican Party presidential debate through faux advertising that the season would premiere on March 4, 2016. In January, show creator, executive producer and showrunner Beau Willimon's departure following the season was announced. The first trailer for the season, which focused on the contentious relationship between the Underwoods, was released on February 10. The press release associated with the trailer said "In an election year, the stakes are now higher than ever, and the biggest threat they face is contending with each other."

Cast
On July 1, 2015, Neve Campbell was announced as having been cast for season 4. In September 2015, Colm Feore was announced as having a recurring role. In February 2016, Joel Kinnaman was announced as having a recurring role. On February 10, Ellen Burstyn and Cicely Tyson were announced as cast members in conjunction with the release of the first trailer for the season.

 Kevin Spacey as Francis J. Underwood, the President of the United States
 Robin Wright as Claire Underwood, First Lady of the United States and former United States Ambassador to the United Nations
 Michael Kelly as Douglas "Doug" Stamper, the White House Chief of Staff
 Mahershala Ali as Remy Danton, the former White House Chief of Staff under President Underwood
 Jayne Atkinson as Catherine Durant, Secretary of State
 Neve Campbell as LeAnn Harvey, a Texas-based political consultant
 Derek Cecil as Seth Grayson, the White House Press Secretary
 Nathan Darrow as Edward Meechum, the Underwoods' Secret Service bodyguard
 Kim Dickens as Kate Baldwin
 Elizabeth Marvel as Heather Dunbar, the former Solicitor General of the United States and Democratic presidential candidate
 Dominique McElligott as Hannah Conway, wife of New York Governor and Republican presidential nominee Will Conway
 Molly Parker as Jacqueline "Jackie" Sharp, the Deputy House Minority Whip and Democratic presidential candidate
 Damian Young as Aidan Macallan, data scientist and friend of LeAnn Harvey
 Paul Sparks as Thomas Yates, an author and speechwriter for the Underwoods
 Sebastian Arcelus as Lucas Goodwin, former reporter at The Washington Herald 
 Boris McGiver as Tom Hammerschmidt, the former editor of The Washington Herald and former boss of Lucas Goodwin
 Ellen Burstyn as Elizabeth Hale, Claire's mother
 Colm Feore as General Ted Brockhart, Republican Vice Presidential candidate
 Cicely Tyson as Doris Jones, a Texas congresswoman
 LisaGay Hamilton as Celia Jones, Doris' daughter
 Joel Kinnaman as Will Conway, the Republican nominee for president and Governor of New York
 Lars Mikkelsen as Viktor Petrov, the President of the Russian Federation
 Larry Pine as Bob Birch, the House Minority Leader and a Democratic U.S. Representative from Michigan
 Reed Birney as Donald Blythe, the Vice President of the United States
 Eisa Davis as Cynthia Driscoll, Heather Dunbar's campaign manager
 Curtiss Cook as Terry Womack, the House Minority Whip
 Constance Zimmer as Janine Skorsky 
 Michel Gill as Garrett Walker, the former President of the United States and Frank's predecessor
 Kate Mara as reporter Zoe Barnes
 Corey Stoll as former Congressman Peter Russo
 Kathleen Chalfant as Margaret Tilden, CEO of The Washington Herald
 Gerald McRaney as Raymond Tusk, former associate of President Walker's and adversary of Frank
 Reg E. Cathey as Frederick "Freddy" Hayes, White House gardener and former restaurant owner
 Wendy Moniz as Laura Moretti, widow of a liver transplant candidate

Episodes

Reception

Critical response
The fourth season has received positive reviews from critics. On Metacritic, the season has a score of 76 out of 100 based on 17 reviews. On Rotten Tomatoes, the season has an 88% approval rating, with an average rating of 7.8/10 based on 32 reviews. The site's critical consensus reads, "House of Cards retains its binge-worthiness by ratcheting up the drama, and deepening Robin Wright's role even further." Matt Fowler of IGN gave the season a rating of 8.6 out of 10 and labelled the season "great" with particular praise given to the performances, the addition of new characters, connections to previous seasons and adding new adversaries to the Underwoods.

Accolades
House of Cards received 13 nominations in the drama categories for the 68th Primetime Emmy Awards, including Outstanding Drama Series, Kevin Spacey for Outstanding Lead Actor, Robin Wright for Outstanding Lead Actress, Michael Kelly for Outstanding Supporting Actor, Reg E. Cathey, Paul Sparks and Mahershala Ali for Outstanding Guest Actor, and Ellen Burstyn and Molly Parker for Outstanding Guest Actress.

References

External links

2016 American television seasons
House of Cards (American TV series) seasons